The 34th Pennsylvania House of Representatives District is located in southwest Pennsylvania and has been vacant since the 2022 resignation of Summer Lee.

District profile
The 34th Pennsylvania House of Representatives District is located in Allegheny County and includes the following areas:

 Braddock
 Braddock Hills
 Chalfant
 Churchill
East Pittsburgh
 Edgewood
 Forest Hills
 North Braddock
 Pittsburgh (part)
 Ward 13 (part) 
Division 01 
Division 08 
Division 10 
Division 13 
Division 14 
Ward 14 (part)
Division 12 
Division 13 
Division 14 
Division 15 
Division 16 
Division 17 
Division 18
 Rankin
 Swissvale
 Wilkins Township
Wilkinsburg

Representatives

Recent election results

References

External links
District map from the United States Census Bureau
Pennsylvania House Legislative District Maps from the Pennsylvania Redistricting Commission.  
Population Data for District 34 from the Pennsylvania Redistricting Commission.

Government of Allegheny County, Pennsylvania
34